English etymology is the study of where English words came from. It may refer to:

History of the English language
English words of Greek origin
List of Greek morphemes used in English
List of Greek and Latin roots in English
Latin influence in English
List of Latin words with English derivatives
Lists of English words by country or language of origin
Classical compound
Hybrid word#English examples
List of common false etymologies of English words

Bibliography  
The Oxford Dictionary of English Etymology
A Dictionary of English Etymology